Pelseneeria is a genus of very small ectoparasitic sea snails, marine gastropod mollusks or micromollusks in the family Eulimidae. This genus was first described by R. Koehler and C. Vaney in 1908.

Species
Species within the genera Pelseneeria include:

Pelseneeria bountyensis Powell, 1933
Pelseneeria brunnea Tate, 1887
Pelseneeria castanea Dall, 1925
Pelseneeria hawaiiensis Warén, B. L. Burch & T. A. Burch, 1984
Pelseneeria media Koehler & Vaney, 1908
Pelseneeria minor Koehler & Vaney, 1908 
Pelseneeria minuta Dall, 1927
Pelseneeria perdepressa Dall, 1925
Pelseneeria profunda Koehler & Vaney, 1908 (Type taxon)
Pelseneeria secunda Powell, 1940
 † Pelseneeria senuti Lozouet, 1999 
Pelseneeria sibogae Schepman & Nierstrasz, 1909
Pelseneeria stimpsonii A. E. Verrill, 1872
Pelseneeria striata Bouchet & Warén, 1986
Pelseneeria stylifera Turton, 1825
Pelseneeria sudamericana Pastorino & Zelaya, 2001
Pelseneeria thurstoni Winckworth, 1936
Pelseneeria yamamotoi Habe, 1952
Species brought into synonymy
 Pelseneeria globosus (Johnston, 1841): synonym of Pelseneeria stylifera (Turton, 1825)
 Pelseneeria secundus [sic]: synonym of Pelseneeria secunda (Powell, 1940)
 Pelseneeria turtoni (Broderip, 1832): synonym of Pelseneeria stylifera (Turton, 1825)
 Pelseneeria verrilli (Dall, 1927): synonym of Pelseneeria stimpsonii (A. E. Verrill, 1872)

References

 Koehler R. & Vaney C. (1908). Description d'un nouveau genre de Prosobranches parasite sur certains Echinides. Bulletin de l'Institut Océanographique de Monaco 118: 1-16
 Winckworth, R. (1932). The British marine Mollusca. Journal of Conchology. 19 (7): 211-252.
 Ivanov, 1952 [Trudy Leningradskogo Obshchestva Estestvoispytatelei, Otdelenie Zoologii, 71(4): 134].
 Powell, 1939 : Records of the Auckland Institute and Museum, 2(4): 234
 Warén, A. (1984). A generic revision of the family Eulimidae (Gastropoda, Prosobranchia). Journal of Molluscan Studies. suppl 13: 1-96. page(s): 64

Further reading

External links
 Fleming, J. (1828). A history of British animals, exhibiting the descriptive characters and systematical arrangement of the genera and species of quadrupeds, birds, reptiles, fishes, Mollusca, and Radiata of the United Kingdom; including the indigenous, extirpated, and extinct kinds, together with periodical and occasional visitants. Edinburgh, Bell & Bradfute / London, James Duncan. Pp. i-xxii, 1-565. corrigenda.
 Marine Species Identification Portal

Eulimidae
Gastropod genera